Bern Township may refer to the following townships in the United States:

 Bern Township, Athens County, Ohio
 Bern Township, Berks County, Pennsylvania

See also
 Upper Bern Township, Berks County, Pennsylvania